Jordan Owen Graham (born 30 December 1997) is an English footballer who plays for  side Kettering Town, where he plays as a forward.

Playing career

Leicester City
Graham was born in Peterborough and began his career with Leicester City, where he played for 8 years in the club's academy.

Oxford United
He joined Oxford United in 2015, where he remained for two seasons, although he didn't play for the club, he did enjoy loan spells at non-league level with Didcot Town and Farnborough.

Mansfield Town
Graham signed for Mansfield Town in 2017, and was loaned out for the majority of the 2017–18 season at Hednesford Town, where he made 33 appearances and scored ten goals. Graham made his English Football League debut on 4 August 2018 against Newport County.

On 21 January 2019, Graham signed an 18-month contract with Mansfield Town, seeing him contracted to the club until the end of the 2019–20 season. Mansfield Town confirmed their retained list on 18 May 2020, with the club confirming new contract discussions were underway with Graham, but no new contract materialised, and he departed the club at the expiry of his contract.

Tamworth

On 19 September 2020, Jordan signed for Southern League Premier Division Central side Tamworth following a successful trial period.

Graham made his debut for Tamworth on 22 September 2020, and had a debut to remember. He came on as a 70th-minute substitute for Lindon Meikle in an FA Cup first round fixture at home to Stourbridge. With Tamworth trailing 2-1 upon Graham's introduction, the score line went to 3–1 in the favour of Stourbridge on the 75th minute, but Graham scored a brace, with goals in the 80th and 89th minute to force the tie to penalties, with Graham converting his spot kick as Tamworth triumphed 5–4 on penalties.

Graham scored his first goal in the Southern League Premier Division Central on 26 September 2020, adding the third goal, as Tamworth defeated St Ives Town 4–2.

Following the curtailment of the 2020–21 season, Graham was not retained by Tamworth.

AFC Rushden & Diamonds
On 18 March 2022, Graham signed for Southern League Premier Division Central side AFC Rushden & Diamonds.

Kettering Town
In June 2022, Graham joined National League North club Kettering Town.

Career statistics

Club

References

External links

1997 births
Living people
Sportspeople from Peterborough
English footballers
Association football forwards
Leicester City F.C. players
Oxford United F.C. players
Didcot Town F.C. players
Farnborough F.C. players
Mansfield Town F.C. players
Hednesford Town F.C. players
Tamworth F.C. players
AFC Rushden & Diamonds players
Kettering Town F.C. players
English Football League players
Southern Football League players
Northern Premier League players